Tubularia is a genus of hydroids resembling furry pink tufts or balls at the end of long strings, owing to the common names "pink-mouthed" or "pink-hearted" hydroids.

Description 

The average height of an individual colony is 40–60 mm and the diameter of the polyp and tentacles is 10mm. Tubularia indivisa and Ectopleura larynx may be difficult to distinguish and the two often grow together. In E. larynx the stems branch while in T. indivisa they are unbranched. Tubularia occurs either solitary or in colonies, both being dioecious; possessing large, brilliantly coloured, flowerlike hydrants. Medusae remain attached to the hypostome in clusters, never being dispersed. These animals represent structures of the ancestral coelenterate.

Life cycle 

During the summer time, sperm are released into the water and attracted to female reproductive structures by means of a chemical substance. Internal fertilization occurs in the female medusoids. The fertilized eggs develop into actinula. These larvae develop directly into a new polyp. Although the medusa are attached to the polyp, the life cycle resembles that of typical Cnidarian with the polyp reproducing asexually and the medusa producing egg and sperm.

References

External links
 New Jersey Scuba Diver - Plant-like Animals
 Marine Life Encyclopedia
  MBL Marine Organisms Database page

Tubulariidae
Hydrozoan genera